Garro or de Garro is a Basque surname. Notable people with the surname include:

 Daniel Garro (born 1990), Argentine professional footballer
 Elena Garro (1916–1998), Mexican author
 Jerónimo de Garro (16th-century), Basque nobleman
 José Antonio Ardanza Garro (born 1941), Spanish politician
 José de Garro (1623–1702), Spanish colonial administrator
 Juan Garro (born 1992), Argentine professional footballer
 Magdalena Garro (born 1989), Argentine canoeist
 Nacho Garro (born 1981), Spanish footballer
 Rodrigo Garro (born 1998), Argentine soccer player
 Sebastián de Garro (15th century), Basque nobleman
 Sykes Garro (born 1993), Gibraltarian footballer

Basque-language surnames